Although Konda brings to one’s mind hair, which is its modern meaning in the Sinhala language, Konda in medieval times signified a group of Karava nobles in Sri Lanka. Old timers referred to them as Konda Karáva another clan of the Karava similar to  the Suriya clans Kurukulasuriya, Warnakulasuriya, Mihindukulasuriya, Bharathakulasuriya, Manukulasuriya, Arasakulasuriya and Kón Karávas. Konda came to mean hair in Sri Lanka only after the 15th century Kotte period. Prior to that hair was referred to in the Sinhala language as kes, varalasa, dhammilla or muhulasa.

The name Konda has been preserved to date in Sri Lankan Karava family names such as Vira Konda Árachchige, Vadana Konda Árachchige, Vira Konda Patabendige and other such names. The Kurukula Charithaya (part I 235) reproduces a copper sannasa given by King Vijayabahu, probably Vijayabahu VI, to a Konda Perumal  at a time when Perumal denoted a prince. It also lists the Konda Kaurava family names: Konda Perumal Árachchigé from Koggala and Kuru Vira Kaundan, Periya Kondan, Sina Kondan, Sella Kondan, Vira Kondan, Kuru VIra Kondan, Kondagé, Vira Kondagé, Maha Kondagé, Punchi Kondagé and Sella Kondagé from other parts of Sri Lanka.
The prevalence of the name Konda in various parts of South India suggests that a significant group of Kondas of considerable importance lived in mediaeval South India. Similar to the other South Indian Kshatriya clans the Kondas too may have claimed descent ultimately from the Mahabharata Kauravas.

The name Konda had been widely used in the Pandya kingdom and the Sri Lankan chronicle Mahavamsa refers to Punkonda, Khuddakancha Kunda and Kanga Konda in connection with the 12th century Pandyan invasion by the General of Parákramabáhu the Great  (Mahavamsa 76.94, 76.140, 76.171 & 76.184 ). Parantaka I, the Chola King who defeated the joint Sri Lankan and Pandyan armies had assumed the victory title Dorai Eelam Kondai on that account and therefore it appears that Kondai meant conqueror.

Chola Adithya’s victory over Kondai Mandalam shifted the balance of power between the Pallavas and Cholas and was the beginning of the Chola empire. The Pallavas and Cholas were Kshatriyas connected by intermarriage and both dynasties claimed connections to the Mahabharata kings. Konda  has also been used in place names such as Nagarjunakonda in Andhra Pradesh and  an inscription of  the Sri Lankan King Sahasamalla states that he had spent two years in a place called Gangaikondapattana in India (EZ II 225). And, two South Indian inscriptions by a Pandyan ruler named Kónerimel Kondán say that he had a camp at Gangakondapattana (Annual report on South Indian Epigraphy 125 ). The name Gangai in the above two inscriptions from the Ramnad district of India;  Chodaganga of the Mahavansa account of Sri Lanka’s Pandya invasion referred to above; the word Ganga in the names of Sri Lankan Rulers Chodaganga and Gangavasa Kalyanavati etc. point to the highly interconnected nature of mediaeval royal families in India and Sri Lanka.

The Kudumirissa inscription of Sri Lanka refers to a clan known as  Kaundinya gothra and the Galgané copper sannasa refers to Parákramabáhu sámi’s ancestry as “ Sakala dig vijayavaliya ransa Konda Parákramabáhu piriven sámi". Ulakkonda is a village in Gangapalatha, Udunuvara and Muthukeliyáva a hilly site in Ulakkonda, far removed from the pearl producing coast, brings to  mind the mutukuda (pearl umbrellas) and other insignia of the Karavas. Maluvawatta lies to the east of Ulakkonda and nearby is an ancient Bo tree with a legend that it was planted by a Brahmin in ancient times. As such Ulakkonda may well have been an abode of Konda nobles in the past (Sahithya 72).

Two Kaurálas in a village named Kondagama in Tumpané, have signed a deed in AD 1761 as witnesses (Gazetteer I 468), further documenting the Konda and Karáva linkage of the past. The Pattini cult in Sri Lankan history is associated with the Karavas brought back on king Gajabahu I’s  Indian invasion,  and as expected an old Pattini Devale is still there in the village known as Kondadeniya (Gazetteer II 528). The Rajavaliya narrates that a King named Edirimanasuriya ruled from a city in Sri Lanka known as Mundakondapola (Rajavaliya 234). Mundakondapola is situated 8 miles from Kurunegala on the Puttlam road, in the Hatara Korale, the old ‘Kuru country’ (parana Kuru Rata) of the Karavas.

An old Sinhala verse which sings the praise of a king from Murakondaya who was deified as Irual Bandára says that he was from the Suryawansa, the Kshatriya Solar dynasty (Ceylon the Portuguese Era I 142). A contemporary of this Edirimanasuriya was the Karava King of Jaffna, Ethirimanasingham (AD 1592 - 1615). Ethirimanasingham was a king of the Singhe Dynasty of Jaffna, from which the Karava families of Tisseveerasinghe, Puvirajasinghe, Puvimanasinghe and Philip descend (Singhe Dynasty of Jaffnapattanam 19). The Karava Patangatim Domingo Corea also known as Edirimanasuriya was appointed by king Dharmapala in the 16th century to rule this region. Therefore, King Edirimanasuriya of Mundakondapola too appears to have been a regional Karava King, a Konda Karáva, possibly from the Kshatriya Keerawella family of the Hatara Korale.

As such it appears that Konda in mediaeval India and Sri Lanka was a branch of  the interrelated South Indian Kshatriya families which were spread in the Chola, Pandya and Pallava kingdoms and Sri Lanka. Over the centuries the Kondas have virtually been forgotten and traces of the Kondas remain only in a few place names and in Karáva family names.

References
Kurukula Charithaya part I 1968 Kurukula Vendar A. S. F. Weerasuriya
Mahavansa Geiger translation
 EZ (Epigraphia Zeylanica) II, Colombo Museum
Annual report on South Indian epigraphy Calcutta 1916 Nos 71 -72 
Sáhithya  Ministry of Culture Sri Lanka 1972.
Gazetteer of the Central Province  Lawrie  
Rajavaliya, Suraweera edition
Ceylon the Portuguese Era, P. E. Pieris
The Singhe Dynasty of Jaffnapatam Chevalier Dr. St John Puvirajasinghe K.S.G. Jaffna

External links
 Karava web site - Kshatriya Maha Sabha Sri Lanka 

Sinhalese castes